Executioner is the debut studio album by American heavy metal band Mantic Ritual, released in 2009 on Nuclear Blast Records. This is their only release with drummer Adam Haritan, and would be the only studio album from the band until the 2022 release of their upcoming second album.

Critical reception 

Exclaim! gave a strongly positive review of the album, describing it as "upbeat blast of cutting aggression, riding the fine line between onslaught and overbearing". AllMusic noted the lack of originality in the band's songs. However, the performance quality and energy were both complimented as exemplars of thrash metal.

Track listing 
All songs written by Mantic Ritual.

Personnel 
 Dan Wetmore – vocals, guitar
 Jeff Potts – guitar
 Ben Mottsman – bass
 Adam Haritan – drums

References

External links 
 Nuclear Blast artist page

2009 debut albums
Mantic Ritual albums